The Central District of Kalaleh County is a district (bakhsh) in Kalaleh County, Golestan Province, Iran. At the 2006 census, its population was 80,373, in 17,673 families.  The District has one city: Kalaleh.  The District has three rural districts (dehestans): Aq Su Rural District, Kongor Rural District, and Tamran Rural District.

References 

Districts of Golestan Province
Kalaleh County